K-100 was an entertainment information programme which was shown on Hong Kong's Television Broadcasts Limited (TVB). The program provided information about upcoming and latest shows airing on TVB. It also featured interviews with celebrities who work for the station, and behind-the-scenes peeks at the station's studio complex  (電視廣播城). In addition, K-100 also announced the station's top-five shows over the previous week in terms of viewership during the "Viewership Ratings" segment (收視龍虎榜).

The name "K-100" originated from the station's previous post office box number, with the "K-" prefix indicating that the box was located in Kowloon. The station's PO box was re-numbered to "70100" following the postal service's consolidation of its PO boxes, but the programme's name stuck.

The program debuted on January 22, 1977, and ran almost every week until September 17, 2005, when it was replaced by another show called "E-Buzz". 1,449 episodes of K-100 had been taped since its inception.

External links
K-100 official homepage (TVB, Chinese)
Viewership Ratings (收視龍虎榜, TVB, Chinese)
K-100 Forum (網上自由講, TVB, Chinese)

TVB original programming
1977 Hong Kong television series debuts
2005 Hong Kong television series endings
1970s Hong Kong television series
1980s Hong Kong television series
1990s Hong Kong television series
2000s Hong Kong television series
Cantonese-language television shows